The New Haven Warriors were a rugby league football team based in New Haven, Connecticut, U.S. They played in the American National Rugby League (AMNRL) from 2006 to 2010 and in the USA Rugby League (USARL) from 2011 to 2012 before withdrawing. They played their home games at Ken Strong Stadium in West Haven, Connecticut.

The team was established in 2006 as an AMNRL expansion team. In 2011 they became one of seven clubs that withdrew from the AMNRL to form the new USA Rugby League. The Warriors won the 2008 AMNRL Championship and made playoff appearances every year from 2006 to 2011, advancing to the AMNRL Grand Final in 2010 and the USARL Grand Final in 2011. They were named for the New Zealand professional club the New Zealand Warriors of the National Rugby League.

History

AMNRL
The club was founded for the 2006 AMNRL season by Adam Hamon, Blair Wards, Chris Willey and Tony Feasey. The Warriors management later consisted  of Adam Hamon (chairman), Brian Lee (Marketing and Sponsorship), Chris Yergan (Treasurer), Bill West and Ed Reed (IT), and executive committee members Tony Feasey, Siose Muliumu. In their debut AMNRL season the Warriors side had an impressive inaugural year finishing 5th and within the top tier bracket of the competition and qualifying for the playoff series; however, they would eventually be knocked out by the New York Knights in a close encounter that finished 26–22.

In 2007 the club again finished 5th and again faced the New York Knights in the playoffs to the final. This time they won 34–8 but were eliminated by their interstate rivals and eventual champions the Connecticut Wildcats in the semifinals 42–18. The Warriors earned the reputation as the most physical side in the AMNRL, and includes several Maori and Polynesian players from New Zealand. In 2008, the club won the Grand Final, beating the Aston Bulls 50–18 at Fort Dix, New Jersey. They advanced through the semifinal by beating the Connecticut Wildcats 40–34.

USARL
On January 12, 2011, New Haven became one of seven teams to break away from the AMNRL and form the new USA Rugby League. After finishing fourth in the regular season and advancing to the playoffs, the Warriors achieved an upset win over the minor premiers Jacksonville Axemen to secure a championship final berth against the Philadelphia Fight. They were defeated by Philadelphia in the USARL's inaugural Grand Final.

New Haven finished seventh of eight teams in 2012, missing the playoffs. They were initially announced as competing in 2013, but withdrew before the season, along with Oneida FC of Boston.

USARL season summaries

Uniform and colors

For their inaugural American National Rugby League season the club adopted the colors of navy blue, green and white stripe design characteristic of the old style vintage rugby league jerseys. The warriors later sport the reverse colors of their affiliate club, the New Zealand Warriors, who played in grey and black.

Stadium
The Warriors home ground was Ken Strong Stadium at West Haven High School in West Haven, Connecticut.

Statistics and records
Biggest winning margin 

Biggest losing margin 

Most points for the club 

Most points in a match

Honors
2006 - 1/4 finalists

2007 - semifinalists

2008 - Grand Final Winners

2009 - semifinalists

AMNRL Championship titles: 1
2010 - Grand finalist runner up
2011 - Grand finalist runner up

See also
Rugby league in the United States
List of defunct rugby league clubs in the United States

References

External links

2006 establishments in Connecticut
2013 disestablishments in Connecticut
American National Rugby League teams
Defunct rugby league teams in the United States
Defunct sports teams in Connecticut
Rugby clubs established in 2006
Rugby league in Connecticut
Warriors
Sports clubs disestablished in 2013
USA Rugby League teams